Madeline: Lost in Paris is a 1999 American direct-to-video animated musical adventure comedy-drama film produced by DIC Entertainment, L.P. It was released on Tuesday, August 3, 1999 to VHS and August 24 to DVD by Buena Vista Home Video under the Walt Disney Home Video imprint. In 2009, the film was released on iTunes for the film's 10th anniversary.

Plot
Madeline, an orphaned girl who attends a Parisian boarding school, receives a letter in the mail from her from her long-lost Uncle Horst from Vienna, who is planning on a visit. He arrives at the school later that week, where he announces that he has been designated Madeline's new legal guardian (shows the court papers to Miss Clavel, her teacher). Horst plans on taking her to his hometown Vienna, to attend a fine finishing school, and plan on leaving the following day via the Orient Express. Madeline and her classmates react with shock, elation, and sadness. 

When Uncle Horst and his niece set off the next morning, he takes Madeline on the Paris Métro, rather than the Orient Express, to an unfamiliar part of the town ravaged with poverty and crime. Realizing she is being kidnapped, Madeline throws beads of her mother's treasured necklace to make a trail to where she is taken to. It is then revealed that Uncle Horst is not Madeline's uncle, but a Frenchman named Henri, who works for Madame LaCroque, the owner of a lace shop/factory. Henri takes Madeline to the lace shop's basement, full of orphan girls who are forced into making laces to sell. One of the girls, Fifi, befriends Madeline. It is then revealed that Madeline's court custody papers were forged by Madame LaCroque, and that the criminal duo plan to steal her family inheritance as she labors in the factory.

Shortly after Madeline left, Miss Clavel, the girls, and Pepito tried to stop her and Horst so that Pepito could give her his Halloween parting gift: A shrunken head from Brazil. They arrive at the train station, only to learn that the two had taken the Métro, not the Orient Express. They also find Genevieve abandoned at the station. Fearing the worst, Miss Clavel enlists the police to help them rescue Madeline.

At the lace shop, the child workers endure enormous amounts of emotional and physical abuse at the hands of LaCroque. Fifi tells Madeline of how LaCroque was once a cabaret dancer who experienced a performance disaster. In total humiliation, she stopped performing and sold her long hair to make lace. She and Henri then gained legal custody all of the orphan girls. Rather than taking care of them (as she promised to the courts), she uses them as her miserable slaves. 

Through following the trail of Madeline's beads, Madeline's classmates and Pepito find their way to the factory. Pepito uses his shrunken head to first knock off LaCroque's wig from outside the window (revealing her bald head), and then frighten her to the ground. Meanwhile, Miss Clavel and the police catch Henri walking through the streets of Paris, planning to sell-off Madeline's belongings. Through a plea bargain deal, Henri agrees to lead them to the lace factory, in exchange for a lighter punishment. Madeline and all of her friends are able to tie up LaCroque in endless rolls of lace just as the police arrive with Henri and Miss Clavel. Henri makes one last attempt to escape, only to be tripped by Pepito's spool trick, allowing the girls to tangle him up as well. The criminal duo are arrested by the police and taken away. The factory girls, however, still have no place to call home. 

Madeline receives a substantial financial reward for LaCroque's capture, and she uses it to start a school for her lace factory coworkers. The girls from both schools rejoice in the fact that they are all one whole family.

Production
In March 1998, the film was announced as the first project from DIC's new "video premieres" division.

DVD releases 
Walt Disney Home Video released Madeline: Lost in Paris on DVD on August 24, 1999 with widescreen ratio 1.66:1 and Shout! Factory re-released the film with full frame on DVD on April 3, 2010. It was released in Australia in 2013 by Umbrella Entertainment.

Voice cast 
 Andrea Libman as Madeline
 Christopher Plummer as the Narrator
 Lauren Bacall as Madame LaCroque
 Jason Alexander as Uncle Horst / Henri
 Stephanie Louise Vallance as Miss Clavel, Genevieve
 Michael Heyward as Pepito
 Brittney Irvin as Chloe
 Veronika Sztopa as Nicole
 Additional voices include Alex Hood, Jennifer Copping, Tabitha St. Germain, Rochelle Greenwood, French Tickner, Michael Heyward, Garry Chalk, Dale Wilson, Jane Mortifee

Songs 
 "Family" - Madeline & 11 Little Girls
 "We Can Sing, We Can Dance" - 11 Little Girls, Uncle Horst, Mrs. Clavel, Pepito's Mother, Lord Cucuface, Others
 "Oh Dear, Oh Dear" - Miss Clavel, 11 Little Girls, Pepito, Madeline and Uncle Horst
 "Where is the Hope That I Once Knew?" - Madeline & Laceshop Girls
 "Together" - Madeline & Laceshop Girls
 "Family" (Reprise) - Madeline, 11 Little Girls, Pepito & Laceshop Girls

Reception 
William David Lee of DVD Town, criticizing the special, panned the "not very memorable" songs and "simplistic and predictable" story, but recommended the film for young audiences.

References

External links 
 
 

1999 direct-to-video films
American children's animated adventure films
American children's animated comedy films
American children's animated drama films
American children's animated musical films
American musical drama films
American direct-to-video films
Animated films about orphans
Animated films set in Paris
Children's comedy-drama films
Animated films about children
Films about child abduction in France
Animated films based on children's books
Madeline
DIC Entertainment films
Buena Vista Home Entertainment direct-to-video films
1990s English-language films
1990s American films
1990s French films